Bursters (Hangul: 버스터즈, formerly known as Burstered (버스터리드) is a South Korean metalcore band under Evermore Music. The group first appeared on Superstar K6, in which the band finished at Top 6 as the first-ever heavy rock band in Superstar K history to do so. They released their debut album, Live In Hope, on April 16, 2017, which received a high score of 85/100 on Japan's renowned hard rock and metal magazine Burrn!. The band is also the first Korean artist to have been included in the weekly radio playlist of Kerrang! with the single "Barriers".

The first single, "Colors", off of their second album, Once and For All, was released on February 19, 2020.

Members
 Dae-gun Noh (노대건) – Vocalist
 Jun-yong Ahn (안준용) – Guitarist
 Gye-jin Lee (이계진) – Guitarist
 Hwan-hee Jo (조환희) – Bassist
 Tae-hee Jo (조태희) – Drummer

Discography

Studio albums

Extended plays

Single albums

Singles

References

External links

South Korean rock music groups
Musical groups established in 2014
Superstar K participants
2014 establishments in South Korea